The Pachaiyar River originates on the eastern slopes of the Western Ghats approximately  above sea level in the state of  Tamil Nadu in southern India. It then  converges with the Tambaraparani River.  Nine anicuts have been  built across it before it loses its identity in the Tamiraparani.The river Pachaiyar has three tributaries which are Kavayan Odai,  Anaikidangu Odai and Uppan Odai. These tributaries join the river Pachaiyar in the villages Arasppattu, Vadagarai and Padmaneri respectively.

Notes

Rivers of Tamil Nadu
Rivers of India